Paul Barclay is an Australian writer, journalist, radio presenter and producer.

Biography
Barclay was born in Melbourne.

Since the late 1990s, he has worked as a radio presenter for the Australian Broadcasting Corporation in Queensland, Northern Territory, and Victoria. In 2005, Barclay won the Walkley Award for his investigation of the events and issues surrounding Australia's notorious Philip Nitschke, "Dr Death".

Barclay has produced stories on most of the ABC radio networks for over 20 years.  he is a regular host and presenter on Radio National's program Big Ideas, a program he has hosted since at least 2003.

References

External links

Australian radio personalities
Living people
Year of birth missing (living people)